Eas Gobhain is a river in the Trossachs of Scotland just west of Callander
. It is the outflow of Loch Venachar and joins with Garbh Uisge west of Callander to form the River Teith. The name of the river, Eas Gobhain, translates from Gaelic as "the smith's cascade".

References

Rivers of Stirling (council area)
Tributaries of the Teith